Teracom Group AB is a Swedish state-owned company that delivers information and communication services aimed at operators of essential functions within the Swedish civilian and military systems.

Teracom was established in 1992, as a spin-off from the Swedish Televerket telecommunications agency, ahead of its corporatisation into the Swedish incumbent operator Telia. The reason behind the spin-off was to separate what became Teracom from the commercial aspect of the now-deregulated Swedish telecom business. In October 2018, Teracom sold its Danish subsidiary (Teracom A/S) to the London-based investment company Agilitas Private Equity LLP, which subsequently changed the latter's name to Cibicom A/S in January 2019. In 2019, Teracom acquired the Swedish subsidiary of the mobile wireless broadband operator Net 1, now Teracom Mobil AB. The background to Teracom's acquisition of Net1 was to secure telecommunications via mobile broadband to authorities and companies via the 450 MHz band with government control and in the long term.

See also 
 List of Swedish government enterprises
 Digital terrestrial television in Sweden

External links 
 Teracom - Official site

References 

Government-owned companies of Sweden
Telecommunications companies of Sweden
Government-owned telecommunications companies
1992 establishments in Sweden
Swedish companies established in 1992
Telecommunications companies established in 1992
Companies based in Stockholm